Juan Carlos de la Barrera Lara (born 17 March 1983) is a Mexican former football player who last played for Tampico Madero in the Ascenso MX.

Club career
A native of Querétaro, Querétaro, De la Barrera is a product of Querétaro F.C.'s youth system. He has had a journeyman's career, making his Mexican Primera División debut with Irapuato FC in September 2003, followed by short stints at Puebla F.C. and C.F. Pachuca.

The central defender next spend four years with Indios de Ciudad Juárez, playing in the Primera División A where he was the vice-captain of the team. On May 15, 2010, he rejoined Puebla F.C.

In January 2011, shortly after joining San Luis F.C., De la Barrera was seriously injured in an auto accident in San José Iturbide, which ruled him out of the team for six months.

International
De la Barerra Participated in the 2003 FIFA World Youth Championship, with Mexico.

Personal
De la Barrera's father, also Juan Carlos, was also a professional footballer who played for Atletas Campesinos.

References

External links

1983 births
Living people
People from Querétaro
Association football defenders
Mexican footballers
Mexico under-20 international footballers
Irapuato F.C. footballers
Club Puebla players
C.F. Pachuca players
Indios de Ciudad Juárez footballers
San Luis F.C. players
Correcaminos UAT footballers
Liga MX players